A Soul Haunted by Painting (also known as Soul of a Painter and Pan Yu Liang (Pan Yuliang), a Woman Painter) is a 1994 Chinese film starring Gong Li and directed by Huang Shuqin.

It is loosely based on the life of Pan Yuliang, a former prostitute turned painter.

External links 
 
 

1994 films
1990s biographical drama films
Chinese biographical drama films
1994 drama films
Biographical films about painters
Cultural depictions of painters
Films about prostitution
Cultural depictions of Chinese women
Cultural depictions of prostitutes